Khem Bahadur Bum is a Nepalese politician, belonging to the Communist Party of Nepal (Maoist). In the 2008 Constituent Assembly election he was elected from the Doti-2 constituency, winning 10929 votes.

References

Living people
Nepalese atheists
Communist Party of Nepal (Maoist Centre) politicians
Year of birth missing (living people)

Members of the 1st Nepalese Constituent Assembly